Homura may refer to:

 Homura (moth), a genus of snout moths
 , theme song of the movie Demon Slayer: Kimetsu no Yaiba the Movie: Mugen Train

People with the given name
 Homura Kawamoto Japanese manga artist and writer.

People with the surname
 Jin Homura (born 1948), painter in Japan

Video games
 Homura (PlayStation 2 game) a PlayStation 2 video game released in  2005.

Fictional characters
, a fictional character in the My Hime anime/manga series
, a fictional character in the anime/manga Puella Magi Madoka Magica
, a NPC in the BlazBlue series
, a fictional character in the Bleach anime
, a fictional character in the manga/anime Naruto
, one of the dragons in the manga/anime Flame of Recca
, a fictional character in the manga series Saiyuki
, a fictional character in the Senran Kagura series
, a fictional character in the manga Edens Zero

See also
 Hōmura Uta, a 2005 album released by Mucc

Japanese-language surnames